Tracee Hutchison is a writer and TV and radio broadcaster.

Career
She produced and presented a series on Australian music in the 1980s for Triple J in 1990 – featuring interviews with Australian musicians including Nick Cave, Chrissy Amphlett, David McComb, Paul Kelly and Jimmy Barnes – which became her first book Your Name's on the Door – 10 Years of Australian Music (1992/ABC books).

Hutchison was talent producer and scriptwriter for series 2 and 3 of RocKwiz (SBS TV) and also the series producer of nomad (SBS TV), the program that discovered silverchair in a national demo competition in 1994.

Tracee has also been a reporter for The 7.30 Report, hosted the ABC2 Music program DIG TV, and was a fill-in presenter for ABC News Breakfast. She has also been a fill in presenter on ABC Radio Melbourne and ABC Radio Sydney.

She wrote a weekly opinion column for the Saturday Age from 2005 to 2009 and conceived and edited two fund-raising cookbooks for the Mirabel Foundation: Rock Chefs for Mirabel (1992), featuring Australian musicians Tim Rogers, Tex Perkins, Deborah Conway, Archie Roach & Ruby Hunter and Ed Kuepper and their favorite recipes, and Laughing Stock – Comedy Chefs for Mirabel (2007), featuring Australian comedians Eddie Perfect, Tim Minchin, Dave Hughes, Tripod, Corinne Grant, Libby Gorr and Julia Zemiro.

Hutchison has written on social justice issues, environment and indigenous issues, she was commissioned by The Black Arm Band to write an essay on the history of Aboriginal music for the Hidden Republic performance as part of the 2008 Melbourne International Arts Festival.

Writer
In 1995 she wrote and starred in her debut one-woman show I Forgive Catriona Rowntree, at the Melbourne Fringe Festival.

References

External links

Nick Cave interview for 7.30 Report ABC TV
Neil Young interview for 7.30 Report ABC TV
Lou Reed interview for 7.30 Report ABC TV
Patti Smith interview for 7.30 Report ABC TV
Ray Davies interview for 7.30 Report ABC TV

Kev Carmody – Cannot buy my soul. 7.30 Report ABC TV
Profile at ABC Coast to Coast
Saxton Speakers profile page
ICMI Speakers profile page

Living people
1962 births
Australian women radio presenters
Australian television presenters
Australian women television presenters
Triple J announcers